Evelyn County may refer to:
 Evelyn County, New South Wales, Australia
 Evelyn County, Victoria, Australia